Civair is an aircraft charter operator based in Cape Town, South Africa. The company's core business is the operation of helicopter charters.

History 
Civair has operated helicopter and fixed-wing business charter services since 1989. Civair Helicopters CC operates the helicopter and fixed wing charter services, the main business of the organisation.

In March 2004, an attempt was made at starting up a low-cost airline flying between Cape Town and London Stansted, planning to serve the route three times a week with a Boeing 747-200. The now defunct Civair Airways (Pty) Ltd was due to operate the web-based international budget airline.

In December 2004, about 7,400 passengers were left out-of-pocket when it transpired that Civair did not have an aircraft available for the flights, nor did it have the funding to offer any alternatives. No authority had been received from United Kingdom transport officials for landing in the UK either. Amidst the public relations disaster that followed, partial refunds were given to passengers who purchased tickets on their website, civair.com, their only ticket outlet. None of the passengers were ever officially notified of the cancellations. Civair received a further blow when it was discovered that the Proudly South African logo (a South African business standards association) was being illegally used, as Civair was not a member. Early in 2005, the company's director Andy Cluver, together with Kobus Nell, the organization's accountant, were called to account for Civair's actions by the CAA (Civil Aviation Authority) in South Africa.

Fleet 

As at 2004, Civair utilises six helicopters, and two aeroplanes. Some aircraft in the fleet include:

Helicopters:
2 Bell Jet Ranger Helicopters
1 Hughes 500
2 Robinson R44
1 BO 105

Aircraft:
1 Cessna 207
1 Cessna 414

External links
Civair Helicopters

References

Airlines of South Africa
Airlines established in 1989
Companies based in Cape Town